MicroRNA 93 is a functional RNA and a microRNA that in humans is encoded by the MIR93 gene.

Function
The primary transcript is cleaved by the Drosha ribonuclease III enzyme to produce an approximately 70 nucleotide long stem-loop precursor miRNA (pre-miRNA), which is further cleaved by the cytoplasmic Dicer ribonuclease to generate the mature miRNA and antisense miRNA star (miRNA*) products. The mature miRNA is incorporated into a RNA-induced silencing complex (RISC), which recognizes target messenger RNAs (mRNA) through imperfect base pairing with the miRNA and most commonly results in translational inhibition or destabilization of the target mRNA. The RefSeq represents the predicted microRNA stem-loop.

References

Further reading 

MicroRNA